Richard J. "Dick" Miller (March 10, 1923, in Springville, Iowa – June 27, 2008) was an American sculptor, printmaker, and painter.

Education
Miller was graduated A.B. from Olivet College in Olivet, Michigan, and earned an A.M. degree from Michigan State University. He was the student of sculptor Milton Horn.

Work
Miller participated in national shows by the National Sculpture Society and the Audubon Artists. He was included in the New York Metropolitan Museum of Art exhibition, "American Sculpture 1951".
Commissioned works were executed for Cardinal Pacelli School, Xavier University, Adath Israel Synagogue and the Cincinnati Bicentennial Commission in addition to portrait commissions.

Teaching
Miller was a teacher to many; generations of his students range far and wide. A true master of his craft, Miller furthered his learning by embracing the new technologies that became available throughout his career.  Utilizing digital 3D modeling software, the artist began designing sculptures via computer and then rendered his sculptures based upon his models.

He taught sculpture at Oberlin College, Oberlin Ohio, and at the Art Academy of Cincinnati in Cincinnati, Ohio, 1949–1952. Artist Tom Tsuchiya was Miller's  apprentice at University of Cincinnati. In 1988, he made an 8-foot-tall monument for German-American civil engineer John A. Roebling in Covington, Kentucky.

References

1923 births
2008 deaths
20th-century American painters
American male painters
21st-century American painters
20th-century American sculptors
20th-century American male artists
American male sculptors
20th-century American printmakers
Olivet College alumni
Michigan State University alumni
Oberlin College faculty